This article contains the saints canonized by Pope John Paul II.  Pope John Paul II canonized 482 saints during his twenty-six-year reign as Pope from 1978 to 2005:

See also
List of saints canonized by Pope Leo XIII
List of saints canonized by Pope Pius XI
List of saints canonized by Pope Pius XII
List of saints canonized by Pope John XXIII
List of saints canonized by Pope Paul VI
List of saints canonized by Pope Benedict XVI
List of saints canonized by Pope Francis

References

John Paul 2
Saints